Wugularr, also known by its non-Aboriginal name Beswick, is a small community in the Northern Territory of Australia.

The traditional owners are the Bagala people.

A DC-3 (Dakota) belonging to the Dutch Air Force crash-landed near Beswick (or Beswick Creek, now Barunga?) in 1947. All passengers survived, with four crew travelling about  down the Katherine River to get help. After running out of food they killed one of two dogs they had with them. The wings were eventually removed and the remains of the plane were towed to Katherine.

The community has had books published about local stories, while the NITV children's television show Barrumbi Kids is due to be filmed there in 2021.

Notes

External links
 Wugularr (Beswick)

Aboriginal communities in the Northern Territory